This list of sports awards honoring women is an index to articles about notable awards honoring sportswomen. The list gives the country of the sponsoring organization, but some awards are open to sportswomen around the world. The list includes sub-lists for general awards to female athletes, for awards to association football (soccer) players, to basketball players and to women players in other sports.

All of these sublists include awards for coaches and administrators in women's sports. Awards for these roles are usually not restricted by the recipient's sex or gender.

General awards

Association football

Basketball

Other sports

See also

 Lists of awards
 List of awards honoring women

References

 
Women
Awards